Sørli Church(Local pronunciation: Søli-kjærsja)  is a parish church of the Church of Norway in Lierne municipality in Trøndelag county, Norway. It is located in the village of Mebygda. It is the church for the Sørli parish which is part of the Namdal prosti (deanery) in the Diocese of Nidaros. The red, wooden, Neo-Gothic church was built in a long church style in 1873 using plans drawn up by the architect Carl Julius Bergstrøm. The church seats 250 about people.

History
The earliest existing historical records of the church date back to the year 1548, but the church was not new that year. Not much is known about the old medieval church. In 1613, the Swedish Army burned the church down during the Kalmar War. In 1616, a new church was built on the site of the old church. The new church was pretty small and by 1867 the church was described as being in poor condition. After the new building was completed, the old church was torn down.

See also
List of churches in Nidaros

References

Lierne
Churches in Trøndelag
Wooden churches in Norway
19th-century Church of Norway church buildings
Churches completed in 1873
14th-century establishments in Norway
Long churches in Norway